Sindhughosh-class submarines are  diesel-electric submarines in active service with the Indian Navy. Their names are in Sanskrit, but in their Roman-alphabet forms sometimes a final short -a is dropped.

The Sindhughosh submarines, designated 877EKM, were designed as part of Project 877, and built under a contract between Rosvooruzhenie and the Ministry of Defence (India).

The submarines have a displacement of 3,000 tonnes, a maximum diving depth of 300 meters, top speed of 18 knots, and are able to operate solo for 45 days with a crew of 53. The final unit was the first to be equipped with the 3M-54 Klub (SS-N-27) antiship cruise missiles with a range of 220 km.

Life extension and refit 
INS Sindhuvijay has been upgraded with the hydro acoustical USHUS complex and the CCS-MK radio communications system. On 29 August 2014 DAC cleared  the long-awaited mid-life upgrade of the four Kilo-class submarines, which would be carried out in Indian shipyards and is likely to cost Rs. 4,800 crore (4,800 million). On 5 November 2014 official sources at HSL said more than 90% of the work has been completed on the seventh submarine of the Sindhughosh class INS Sindhukirti. Scheduled to re-join the fleet on 31 March 2015, she re-entered service on 23 May.

The Indian Navy signed a contract with the Russian shipbuilder Sevmash to refit and upgrade the existing submarines and to extend their operational life by 35 years. The first submarine, INS Sindhukesari, will be sent for refit starting June 2016. The extensive refit, the value for which is pegged at Rs 5,000 crore for a total of four submarines, will not only extend the life of the boats but will also upgrade their combat potential and fitted with Klub land attack cruise missile.

In 2015, the naval exercise Malabar, between the navies of India and the United States, involved  and  hunting each other. India Today reported that Sindhudhvaj managed to track Corpus Christi and score a simulated kill without being detected.

In December 2015, L&T was chosen by the Russian shipbuilder Sevmash to be its Indian partner in the refit project. While the first of the four Kilo class subs will go to the Russian Zvezdochka shipyard for inspection and refit, the remaining three are likely to be modernized at the Kattupalli shipyard. The first of the submarines to be modernized at private yard, a first for India, will go in by 2017, An order for 2-3 more submarines could also be commissioned, depending on ongoing acquisition plans of the Indian Navy.

Incidents
On 10 January 2008, INS Sindhughosh collided with the cargo ship MV Leeds Castle. The submarine was reported to have sustained superficial damage to its conning tower. As a result, the submarine was out of service for a month. The cargo ship was in restricted shallow waters.
On 26 February 2010, a fire on board INS Sindhurakshak killed one sailor and injured two others. The fire was due to a defective battery. 
On 14 August 2013 an explosion, followed by a fire, was reported to have occurred on Sindhurakshak. Sindhurakshak sank in the dock.
On 17 January 2014, Sindhughosh ran aground due to the low tide, while returning to the Naval Dockyard, Mumbai.
On 26 February 2014, smoke was detected on board INS Sindhuratna resulting in 7 sailors being rendered unconscious and two dead. Those unconscious were airlifted to hospital

Ships of the class

Gallery

See also
List of active Indian Navy ships
Kilo-class submarine

References

External links
Bharat Rakshak
Global Security

 
Attack submarines
Submarine classes
 
India–Soviet Union relations